Paul Joseph, Count de Smet de Naeyer (13 May 1843 – 9 September 1913) was a Belgian Catholic Party politician.

Born in Ghent, son of a cotton industrialist, he was himself also an industrialist and a banker. He was head of the Société Générale de Belgique and the owner of several coal mines.

He represented Ghent and Eeklo in the Belgian Chamber of Representatives from 1886 to 1908, and served in the Belgian Senate from 1908 to 1913. He served in several governments, as Minister of Finance from 1894 to 1896, and again from 1899 to 1907, combining the portfolio with the Ministry of Public Works. He was the prime minister of Belgium from 1896 to 1899, and again from 1899 to 1907.

Honours 
National
 : 
1899: Minister of State, by Royal Decree.
1900: Created Count de Smet de Naeyer, by Royal Decree.
 Grand Cordon in the Order of Leopold
 Knight Grand Cross in the Order of the African Star
Foreign
 : Knight Grand Cross in the Legion of Honour
 : Knight Grand Cross in the Imperial Order of the Rising Sun
 : Knight Grand Cross in the Order of the Redeemer
 : Knight Grand Cross in the Order of Pius IX
 Knight Grand Cross in the Order of the White Eagle
 Knight Grand Cross in the Order of the Bavarian Crown
 : Knight Grand Cross in the Order of the Red Eagle

References

External links 
 Paul de Smet de Naeyer in ODIS - Online Database for Intermediary Structures 

|-

1843 births
1913 deaths
Belgian Ministers of State
Finance ministers of Belgium
Catholic Party (Belgium) politicians
Counts of Belgium
Politicians from Ghent
Prime Ministers of Belgium
19th-century Belgian businesspeople
Recipients of the Order of the Star of Romania
Businesspeople from Ghent